Term TSP-1 may refer to:

 Thrombospondin 1, a protein that in humans in encoded by the THBS1 gene
 Granzyme A, an enzyme class